Dispar is a genus of skipper butterflies in the family Hesperiidae.

Species
Dispar compacta Butler, 1882

References
Natural History Museum Lepidoptera genus database
Dispar at funet

Hesperiidae genera
Trapezitinae